Utricularia simplex, commonly known as bluecoats, is a very small perennial carnivorous plant that belongs to the genus Utricularia. U. simplex is endemic to Western Australia. It grows as a terrestrial plant in peaty soils in heathland or swamps at altitudes near sea level. It was originally described and published by Robert Brown in 1810.

See also 
 List of Utricularia species

References

External links 

Carnivorous plants of Australia
Eudicots of Western Australia
simplex
Lamiales of Australia
Plants described in 1810